The 1905 San Diego mayoral election was held on April 4, 1905 to elect the mayor of San Diego. John L. Sehon was elected mayor with a majority of the votes.

Candidates
John L. Sehon, retired army captain and member of the San Diego City Council
Dan F. Jones, president of the San Diego City Council
W.J. Kirkwood

Campaign
Incumbent Mayor Frank P. Frary declined to run for reelection. Three candidates campaigned for the open seat: Dan Jones, a Republican, John L. Sehon, a Democrat running on the Non-Partisan ticket, and W.J. Kirkwood, a Socialist.

On April 4, 1905, Sehon was elected mayor with a majority of 52.7 percent of the vote. Jones came in second with 35.9 percent of the vote. Kirkwood came in third with 11.3 percent.

During the campaign, it was questioned whether a retired army officer such as Sehon was eligible for civil office. Fearing that his opponents would attempt to lock him out of office, Sehon broke into City Hall in the middle of the night of the first day of his term to forcibly take possession of the office of the mayor.

Election results

References

1905
1905 California elections
1905 United States mayoral elections
1905
April 1905 events